Television criticism is the act of writing or speaking about television programming to evaluate its worth, meaning, and other aspects. Such criticism can be found in daily newspapers, on culture discussion shows (on TV and radio), and in specialist books and periodicals, all of which are in direct competition for audiences from television. There are many aspects to critiquing something, and those critiques can be found in a variety of places, such as newspapers or journals. While originally developed to critique content for children, it has been used to critique how various issues and topics are presented on television such as feminist and African American representation. Relations with the audience and networks are important to critics, but problems can arise with both.

Overview
Television criticism originally began as a way to analyze the shows children were watching, and to make sure they were getting quality educational content. Originally being defined as visual literacy, the term changed in the '90s to media literacy.

The purpose of television criticism is to evaluate the content of television to make sure the people watching them, whether it be students or citizens, are obtaining some level of reliable education. This education can be for political, ethical, social, or cultural topics and issues.

The act of criticizing has a variety of components to it. California State University, Sacramento professor Leah R. Vande Berg explained that, "The act of criticism involves organizing, systematically and thoroughly describing, analyzing, interpreting, and evaluating patterned relationships to share an informed perspective with others."

The three most important parts of criticism are a key interpretation that the rest of the criticism will follow, sound arguments to back up the interpretation, and solid evidence to support it.

Since television is so accessible to so many people, most newspapers carry TV listings and these are often accompanied by criticism even just to the extent of recommending a particular program or programs from that day's selection of viewing. Television criticism is a way for us to share and gain information about television shows.

Television will often provide a forum for criticizing itself. In the United Kingdom, The Review Show on BBC Four hosts a monthly discussion on the arts with a television series often featuring. Also in the UK is Charlie Brooker's Screenwipe which takes an incisive though humorous look at current television.

Television can be criticized in a variety of ways, usually by watching what is on TV from a certain viewpoint.

Feminist Viewpoint 
Viewing television from a feminist viewpoint refers to watching television programs with the purpose of critiquing the feminine aspects of it.

People who criticize from this viewpoint have three ways of going about it. The first way is to analyze how the female characters are portrayed. The second is to analyze how feminist messages are explored. The third way is to analyze the theme of feminism and how the television content depicts it.

African American Viewpoint 
Viewing television from an African American viewpoint refers to watching television programs to critique how African Americans and their issues are portrayed.

How it could be done was turned into three categories by a television critic named Herman Gray. The first category was assimilation and the discourse of invisibility. This category that any issues related to African Americans should be treated as individual problems and any other political issues should be viewed through a racial lens. The second category is separate-but-equal discourses. This category brings up that the world black characters live in should be the same as the one the white characters live in. The third category is multiculturalism/diversity. This category states that the audience should see Black life and culture through a variety of viewpoints.

Issues in Criticism 
With how big television has gotten, with thousands of channels and countless shows, it has become harder for critics to do their jobs. This was originally seen back in the 1980s, where televisions grew to not only include the normal three networks but channels from nascent cable and three more broadcast networks. The increase in content made critics prioritize what they watched, leading to a wider and more diverse range of critics.

Despite the issues caused by the increase in content, it made critics more important to networks, who relied on them to help them figure out what shows they should advertise. This arose when networks wanted to expand their advertising so it wasn't just on television. The work of critics allowed people to find and get excited about different shows and served as a form of advertisement for the network.

Sometimes issues can arise with the networks. In 1981, the executive producer of NBC, Bud Rukeyser, got into conflict with television critics. Critics were demanding that the sexuality of the main character of the TV show Love, Sydney be revealed. Rukeyser refused to provide an answer and pulled NBC from a press tour in an attempt to punish and assert his power over the critics. His attempt was in vain, as critics become more interested in the other networks at the press tour than with NBC.

Relationship with Readers 
Critics recognize their audience as an important factor in their work and try not to use it to preach their opinions. They admit that they take in industrial factors, such as commercial viability, when reviewing a show, but they also must keep an open mind since they may not be the target audience of the show.

Critics also have to take into consideration the audience's pleasures and evaluations and balance it with their knowledge of the television industry. This means that they have to put a lot of their knowledge of the workings and limitations of the industry to the side when making a review.

Examples of Television Criticism 
The rise of the internet has allowed television critics to publish their work in a cheaper manner that is easy to distribute. Multiple websites dedicated to critiquing television have sprung up over the years, though a lot of them have different ways of critiquing. Some examples of this are the website Television Without Pity providing that provide "more creative and interactive commentary" and FLOW displaying a "more academic, yet still generally accessible discussion of television."

See also
 Did You See...?
 :Category:Television critics

References

External links
Our critics' advice - The Guardian, 8 July 2008.
In this article Nancy Banks-Smith gives advice to young, aspiring, would-be TV critics.

 
Television studies